Ulrich of Saint Gall may refer to any of eight abbots:

 Ulrich I (984–990)
 Ulrich II (1072–1076)
 Ulrich of Eppenstein (1077–1121)
 Ulrich von Tegerfelden (1167–1199)
 Ulrich von Veringen (1199–1200)
 Ulrich von Sax (1204–1220)
 Ulrich von Güttingen (1272–1277)
 Ulrich Rösch (1463–1491)